Novas are cataclysmic nuclear explosions in white dwarf stars.

Novas or NOVAS may also refer to:

 Novas (surname)
 Naval Observatory Vector Astrometry Subroutines, an astronomy software library
 Novas Software, a defunct American circuit design company
 The Novas, a 1960s Texas garage rock band

See also
 Nova (disambiguation)
 Novae (disambiguation)